Fagonia laevis, the California fagonbush, is a species of plant in the Zygophyllaceae, the caltrop family. It is a perennial subshrub of the southwestern United States and Northwestern Mexico desert regions in California, southern Nevada, Arizona, southwest Utah, Sonora, Baja California and Baja California Sur. It thrives upon hot, dry, slopes and hillsides that also receive seasonal-(winters of the Southwest) or monsoon moisture.

Description
The California fagonbush is a spreading ground-hugging plant. As a cousin to the creosote bush, it has similar waxy leaves being an adaptation to desert temperatures. Leaves are dark green, to 1/2 in long, narrow and composed of three leaflets. This subshrub is found in the "Creosote Bush scrub community" of plants-(southern Mojave Desert, northwestern and western Sonoran Desert, and 'Baja Peninsula deserts').

It is a ground cover upon rocks and hillsides, and can hide the actual surface beneath it.

The flowers are star-shaped, 5-petal, and solitary, some plants showing more than others. They are purple-lavender in color, with white near the center. The plant has  opposite leaves, trifoliate with spinescent stipules, a pink corolla and smooth fruits.

References

Jepson Manual Treatment

External links

Fagonia laevis entry at CalFlora=Taxon Report 3566

laevis
North American desert flora
Flora of the Southwestern United States
Flora of Northwestern Mexico
Flora of the Sonoran Deserts
Flora of the California desert regions
Flora of Arizona
Flora of Nevada
Flora of Utah
Flora of Sonora
Flora of Baja California
Natural history of the Mojave Desert
Flora without expected TNC conservation status